DOAP (Description of a Project) is an RDF Schema and XML vocabulary to describe  software projects, in particular free and open source software.

It was created and initially developed by Edd Dumbill to convey semantic information associated with open source software projects.

Adoption 

There are currently generators, validators, viewers, and converters to enable more projects to be able to be included in the semantic web. Freecode's 43 000 projects are now available published with DOAP. It was used in the Python Package Index but is no longer supported there.

Major properties include: homepage, developer, programming-language, os.

Examples 

The following is an example in RDF/XML:

<rdf:RDF xmlns:rdf="http://www.w3.org/1999/02/22-rdf-syntax-ns#" xmlns:doap="http://usefulinc.com/ns/doap#">
 <doap:Project>
  <doap:name>Example project</doap:name>
  <doap:homepage rdf:resource="http://example.com" />
  <doap:programming-language>javascript</doap:programming-language>
  <doap:license rdf:resource="http://example.com/doap/licenses/gpl"/>
 </doap:Project>
</rdf:RDF>

Other properties include Implements specification, anonymous root, platform, browse, mailing list, category, description, helper, tester, short description, audience, screenshots, translator, module, documenter, wiki, repository, name, repository location, language, service endpoint, created, download mirror, vendor, old homepage, revision, download page, license, bug database, maintainer, blog, file-release and release.

References

External links
 
 OSS Watch DOAP Briefing Note
 doapamatic: DOAP generator

Knowledge representation
Semantic Web
Ontology (information science)